Antonio Barać (born 19 January 1997) is a Croatian professional racing cyclist, who currently rides for UCI ProTeam . He rode in the men's road race at the 2019 UCI Road World Championships in Yorkshire, England.

Major results
2017
 2nd Time trial, National Under-23 Road Championships
 5th Overall Tour de Serbia
 5th Belgrade Banjaluka II
2018
 2nd Time trial, National Under-23 Road Championships
2019
 6th Overall Tour of Albania
 8th Croatia–Slovenia
2020
 3rd Road race, National Road Championships
2022
 National Road Championships
2nd Road race
3rd Time trial
 4th Overall Tour of Albania
 10th Overall Tour de Serbie

References

External links

1997 births
Living people
Croatian male cyclists
Sportspeople from Livno
European Games competitors for Croatia
Cyclists at the 2019 European Games
21st-century Croatian people